Club Deportivo Valdefierro is a Spanish football team based in Zaragoza in the community of Aragon. Founded in 1960, it plays in Regional Preferente – Group 1.

Season to season

8 season in Tercera División

References

External links
Futbolme team profile  

Football clubs in Aragon
Sport in Zaragoza
Association football clubs established in 1960
1960 establishments in Spain